Edward Joseph Furgol (March 24, 1917 – March 6, 1997) was an American professional golfer, the winner of the U.S. Open in 1954.

At age twelve, Furgol injured his left elbow when he fell off a set of parallel bars at a playground. Despite several surgeries, the elbow never healed correctly and was left with a crooked arm ten inches (25 cm) shorter as a result. On the recommendation of his doctors, he took up golf.

A Polish American born in New York Mills, New York, Furgol won six times on the PGA Tour, including one major championship, the 1954 U.S. Open. He also played on the Ryder Cup team in 1957. Although he was from the same town as fellow tour player Marty Furgol (1916–2005), they were not related. Furgol died at age 79 in Miami Shores, Florida.

Amateur wins
this list may be incomplete
1945 North and South Amateur

Professional wins (11)

PGA Tour wins (6)

PGA Tour playoff record (2–1)

Other wins (5)
1951 Michigan PGA Championship
1954 Havana Invitational
1962 Tri-State PGA Championship
1963 Tri-State PGA Championship
1965 Tri-State PGA Championship

Sources:

Major championships

Wins (1)

Results timeline

CUT = missed the half-way cut (3rd round cut in 1959 PGA Championship)
R128, R64, R32, R16, QF, SF = Round in which player lost in PGA Championship match play
"T" indicates a tie for a place

Summary

Most consecutive cuts made – 11 (1953 PGA – 1957 Masters)
Longest streak of top-10s – 3 (1956 U.S. Open – 1957 Masters)

U.S. national team appearances
Ryder Cup: 1957
Canada Cup: 1955 (winners, individual winner)
Lakes International Cup: 1954 (withdrew)
Hopkins Trophy: 1955 (winners)

See also
List of golfers with most PGA Tour wins

References

External links

American male golfers
PGA Tour golfers
PGA Tour Champions golfers
Ryder Cup competitors for the United States
Winners of men's major golf championships
Golfers from New York (state)
American people of Polish descent
People from New York Mills, New York
People from Miami Shores, Florida
1917 births
1997 deaths